Ahmad Pournejati is an Iranian reformist politician who served a member of the Parliament of Iran from 2000 to 2004 representing Tehran, Rey, Shemiranat and Eslamshahr.

He was also a deputy director of the Islamic Republic of Iran Broadcasting.

References

1954 births
Living people
People from Qom
Members of the 6th Islamic Consultative Assembly
Deputies of Tehran, Rey, Shemiranat and Eslamshahr
Islamic Iran Participation Front politicians
Association for Defence of Revolution Values politicians
People of the Ministry of Intelligence (Iran)